Molazzana is a comune (municipality) in the Province of Lucca in the Italian region Tuscany, located about  northwest of Florence and about  northwest of Lucca.

Molazzana borders the following municipalities: Barga, Careggine, Castelnuovo di Garfagnana, Gallicano, Stazzema, Fabbriche di Vergemoli.

References

Cities and towns in Tuscany